Labour government or Labor government may refer to:

Australia
In Australian politics, a Labor government  may refer to the following governments administered by the Australian Labor Party:

 Watson Government, one Australian ministry under Chris Watson
Watson Ministry, the Australian government under Chris Watson (1904)
 Fisher Government, three Australian ministries under Andrew Fisher
First Fisher Ministry, the Australian government under Andrew Fisher (1908–1909)
Second Fisher Ministry, the Australian government under Andrew Fisher (1910–1913)
Third Fisher Ministry, the Australian government under Andrew Fisher (1914–1915)
 Hughes Government (1915–16), one Australian ministry under Billy Hughes
First Hughes Ministry, the Australian government under Billy Hughes (1915–1916)
 Scullin Government, one Australian ministry under James Scullin
Scullin Ministry, the Australian government under James Scullin (1929–1932)
 Curtin Government, two Australian ministries under John Curtin
First Curtin Ministry, the Australian government under John Curtin (1941–1943)
Second Curtin Ministry, the Australian government under John Curtin (1943–1945)
 Forde Government, one Australian ministry under Frank Forde
Forde Ministry, the Australian government under Frank Forde (1945)
 Chifley Government, two Australian ministries under Ben Chifley
First Chifley Ministry, the Australian government under Ben Chifley (1945–1946)
Second Chifley Ministry, the Australian government under Ben Chifley (1946–1949)
 Whitlam Government, three Australian ministries under Gough Whitlam
First Whitlam Ministry, the Australian government under Gough Whitlam (1972)
Second Whitlam Ministry, the Australian government under Gough Whitlam (1972–1974)
Third Whitlam Ministry, the Australian government under Gough Whitlam (1974–1975)
 Hawke Government, four Australian ministries under Bob Hawke
First Hawke Ministry, the Australian government under Bob Hawke (1983–1984)
Second Hawke Ministry, the Australian government under Bob Hawke (1984–1987)
Third Hawke Ministry, the Australian government under Bob Hawke (1987–1990)
Fourth Hawke Ministry, the Australian government under Bob Hawke (1990–1991)
 Keating Government, two Australian ministries under Paul Keating
First Keating Ministry, the Australian government under Paul Keating (1991–1993)
Second Keating Ministry, the Australian government under Paul Keating (1993–1996)
 Rudd Government (2007–10), one Australian ministry under Kevin Rudd
First Rudd Ministry, the Australian government under Kevin Rudd
 Gillard Government, two Australian ministries under Julia Gillard
First Gillard Ministry, the Australian government under Julia Gillard (2010)
Second Gillard Ministry, the Australian government under Julia Gillard (2010–2013)
 Rudd Government (2013), one Australian ministry under Kevin Rudd
Second Rudd Ministry, the Australian government under Kevin Rudd
 Albanese Government, one Australian ministry under Anthony Albanese
Albanese Ministry, one Australian ministry under Anthony Albanese

Israel
In Israeli politics, a Labor government  may refer to the following governments administered by the Israeli Labor Party:

 Thirteenth government of Israel, the Israeli government under Levi Eshkol (1966–1969)
 Fourteenth government of Israel, the Israeli government under Golda Meir (1969)
 Fifteenth government of Israel, the Israeli government under Golda Meir (1969–1974)
 Sixteenth government of Israel, the Israeli government under Golda Meir (1974)
 Seventeenth government of Israel, the Israeli government under Yitzhak Rabin (1974–1977)
 Twenty-first government of Israel, the Israeli government under Shimon Peres (1984–1986)
 Twenty-fifth government of Israel, the Israeli government under Yitzhak Rabin (1992–1995)
 Twenty-sixth government of Israel, the Israeli government under Shimon Peres (1995–1996)
 Twenty-eighth government of Israel, the Israeli government under Ehud Barak (1999–2001)

Malta
In Maltese politics, a Labour government may refer to the following governments administered by the Labour Party:

 Maltese Government 1947–50, the Maltese government under Paul Boffa
 Maltese Government 1955–58, the Maltese government under Dom Mintoff
 Maltese Government 1971–76, the Maltese government under Dom Mintoff
 Maltese Government 1976–81, the Maltese government under Dom Mintoff
 Maltese Government 1981–87, the Maltese government under Dom Mintoff and Karmenu Mifsud Bonnici respectively
 Maltese Government 1996–98, the Maltese government under Alfred Sant
 Maltese Government 2013–17, the Maltese government under Joseph Muscat
 Maltese Government 2017–22, the Maltese government under Joseph Muscat

Netherlands
In Dutch politics, a Labour government may refer to the following governments administered by the Labour Party:

 Drees–Van Schaik cabinet, the Dutch government under Willem Drees and Josef van Schaik (1948–1951)
 First Drees cabinet, the Dutch government under Willem Drees (1951–1952)
 Second Drees cabinet, the Dutch government under Willem Drees (1952–1956)
 Third Drees cabinet, the Dutch government under Willem Drees (1956–1958)
 Den Uyl cabinet, the Dutch government under Joop den Uyl (1973–1977)
 First Kok cabinet, the Dutch government under Wim Kok (1994–1998)
 Second Kok cabinet, the Dutch government under Wim Kok (1998–2002)

New Zealand
In New Zealand politics, a Labour government may refer to the following governments administered by the New Zealand Labour Party:

 First Labour Government of New Zealand, the New Zealand government under Michael Joseph Savage and Peter Fraser respectively (1935–1949)
 Second Labour Government of New Zealand, the New Zealand government under Walter Nash (1957–1960)
 Third Labour Government of New Zealand, the New Zealand government under Norman Kirk and Bill Rowling respectively (1972–1975)
 Fourth Labour Government of New Zealand, the New Zealand government under David Lange, Geoffrey Palmer, and Mike Moore respectively (1984–1990)
 Fifth Labour Government of New Zealand, the New Zealand government under Helen Clark (1999–2008)
 Sixth Labour Government of New Zealand, the New Zealand government under Jacinda Ardern (2017–present)

Norway
In Norwegian politics, a Labour government may refer to the following governments administered by the Labour Party:

 Hornsrud's Cabinet, the Norwegian government under Christopher Hornsrud (1928)
 Nygaardsvold's Cabinet, the Norwegian government under Johan Nygaardsvold (1935–1945)
 Gerhardsen's First Cabinet, the Norwegian government under Einar Gerhardsen (1945)
 Gerhardsen's Second Cabinet, the Norwegian government under Einar Gerhardsen (1945–1951)
 Torp's Cabinet, the Norwegian government under Oscar Torp (1951–1955)
 Gerhardsen's Third Cabinet, the Norwegian government under Einar Gerhardsen (1955–1963)
 Gerhardsen's Fourth Cabinet, the Norwegian government under Einar Gerhardsen (1963–1965)
 Bratteli's First Cabinet, the Norwegian government under Trygve Bratteli (1971–1972)
 Bratteli's Second Cabinet, the Norwegian government under Trygve Bratteli (1973–1976)
 Nordli's Cabinet, the Norwegian government under Odvar Nordli (1976–1981)
 Brundtland's First Cabinet, the Norwegian government under Gro Harlem Brundtland (1981)
 Brundtland's Second Cabinet, the Norwegian government under Gro Harlem Brundtland (1986–1989)
 Brundtland's Third Cabinet, the Norwegian government under Gro Harlem Brundtland (1990–1996)
 Jagland's Cabinet, the Norwegian government under Thorbjørn Jagland (1996–1997)
 Stoltenberg's First Cabinet, the Norwegian government under Jens Stoltenberg (2000–2001)
 Stoltenberg's Second Cabinet, the Norwegian government under Jens Stoltenberg (2005–2013)

Singapore
In Singaporean politics, a Labour government may refer to the following governments administered the Labour Front:

 First David Marshall Cabinet, the Singaporean government under David Marshall (1955–1956)
 First Lim Yew Hock Cabinet, the Singaporean government under Lim Yew Hock (1956–1959)

United Kingdom

In British politics, a Labour government may refer to the following governments administered by the Labour Party:

 First MacDonald ministry, the British government under Ramsay MacDonald (1924)
 Second MacDonald ministry, the British government under Ramsay MacDonald (1929–1931)
 Attlee ministry, the British government under Clement Attlee (1945–1951)
 Labour government, 1964–1970, the British government under Harold Wilson
 Labour government, 1974–1979, the British government under Harold Wilson and James Callaghan respectively
 First Blair ministry, the British government under Tony Blair (1997–2001)
 Second Blair ministry, the British government under Tony Blair (2001–2005)
 Third Blair ministry, the British government under Tony Blair (2005–2007)
 Brown ministry, the British government under Gordon Brown (2007–2010)

See also

 
 Labour Party leadership election
 List of Australian ministries
 List of British governments
 List of cabinets of the Netherlands
 List of Labour parties
 List of Maltese governments
 List of Norwegian governments
 List of New Zealand ministries